Tirnale Bangial is a town in the Islamabad Capital Territory of Pakistan. It is located at 33° 28' 45N 73° 16' 10E with an altitude of 554 metres (1820 feet).

The town gets its name from the Bangial tribe, who make up the bulk of the population.

References

Union councils of Islamabad Capital Territory